Elizabeth Fiennes may refer to:

Elizabeth Fiennes de Clinton (1527–1590), Irish noblewoman
Elizabeth Blount, married name Fiennes/Clinton